Nils Kurt Erik Einar Grönberg (5 September 2002 – 21 October 2021), who was commonly known as Einár, was a Swedish rapper. He released four albums, two of which topped the Swedish album chart. In 2019, he won the Musikförläggarnas pris for Breakthrough of the Year and in 2020 he won two Grammis, Sweden's oldest pop music awards. Two of his singles peaked at number one on the Swedish singles chart and four have been certified platinum by the Swedish Recording Industry Association (SRIA). He is also featured on the number-one single "Gamora" by the group Hov1. 

Einár was involved in several high-profile incidents, most notably his kidnap by rival rapper Yasin and a Vårby-based criminal gang in 2020. A week before he was scheduled to testify in a trial connected to his kidnapping, he was found to have been shot dead in what police described as an execution-style shooting.

Early life and career 
Einár was born on 5 September 2002 to the actress Lena Nilsson. He grew up in Enskededalen. At the age of 17, Einár was arrested and given an anti-social behaviour order and lived for several months in a locked child protection home. 

Einár's first solo single "Gucci / Duckar Popo" was streamed on Spotify over one million times. His second single "Katten i trakten" peaked at number one on the Swedish Singles Chart in February 2019. His follow-up single "Rör mig" entered the Sverigetopplistan chart at number three in its first week of release in May 2019. Einár released the studio albums Första klass, Nummer 1 and Welcome to Sweden; The first two albums were released in 2019 and the third on 15 May 2020. Welcome to Sweden debuted and peaked at number two on the Swedish Albums Chart. Första klass and Nummer 1 peaked at number one.

Einár won the Musikförläggarnas pris in 2019 in the Breakthrough of the Year category. At Sveriges Radio's  gala in 2020, which was broadcast on SVT, he won in the Song of the Year category for the song "Katten i trakten." At the 2020 Grammis awards, Einár won the awards for Newcomer of the Year and Hiphop of the Year.

Criminal activity
Einár was convicted for minor narcotics crime, assault and driving without a permit. In October 2021, he was arrested after a stabbing. He also socialised with known criminals. There are also theories that he was behind the murder of the brother of the rival rapper Haval.

Kidnapping 
In April 2020, Einár was kidnapped in a plot that was instigated by rival rapper Yasin and perpetrated by other members of the criminal gang called Vårbynätverket ("Vårby network"). He was held at gunpoint for several hours and his kidnappers took photographs of him and posted them on social media. Yasin was later sentenced to ten months in prison for the kidnapping. Another rapper, Haval Khalil—known as Haval)—was sentenced to two-and-a-half years for complicity in the kidnapping and robbery. The crime and subsequent trials of the perpetrators received international attention. Einár was living under death threats after his kidnapping and was using a protected identity.

Death and subsequent events 
Einár was shot dead on the evening of 21 October 2021 in Hammarby Sjöstad, Stockholm. The shooting was part of a trend of rising gun violence in Sweden that began in the 2010s.

Einár had been scheduled to testify against  Vårbynätverket and Yasin in the Svea hovrätt ("Svea Court of Appeal") the week after his killing. Although he had previously refused to tesitfy and was very public about the fact that he would not participate.  On the morning after his death, Swedish Prime Minister Stefan Löfven and Minister for Culture Amanda Lind sent their condolences to Einár's family and fans.

Funeral 
Einar's funeral took place on 19 November 2021, at the Katarina kyrka in Stockholm. He was buried in Katarina kyrkogård, the cemetery on the Church's grounds.

Discography

 Första klass [First class] (2019)
 Nummer 1 [Number 1] (2019)
 Welcome to Sweden (2020)
 Unge med extra energi [Kid with extra energy] (2020)

See also
List of murdered hip hop musicians
Gun violence in Sweden

References

External links

2002 births
2021 deaths
Swedish rappers
Musicians from Stockholm
21st-century Swedish musicians
Deaths by firearm in Sweden
People murdered in Sweden
Swedish murder victims
Kidnapped Swedish people
2021 murders in Sweden
Musikförläggarnas pris winners